Dixie's BBQ was a barbecue restaurant in Bellevue, Washington. It was known for its hot sauce, "The Man," and bumper stickers throughout the area which read, "Have you met The Man?" It was opened in 1994 by Dixie and Gene Porter, who had lived in the Seattle area for 30 years, working as a nurse and a mechanic, respectively.

Gene Porter's death
Gene Porter died of cancer on February 28, 2010. His wife Dixie and daughter LJ continued to operate Dixie's. until LJ died on February 2, 2011. Dixie carried on the business in the original location until its closure on October 26, 2019.

See also
 List of barbecue restaurants

References

External links
 

Barbecue restaurants in the United States
Restaurants in Washington (state)
Buildings and structures in Bellevue, Washington
Restaurants established in 1994
1994 establishments in Washington (state)